Iskandar Muda Military Region Command is a military territorial command (military district) of the Indonesian Army. It has been in active service as the local division for Aceh Province (from 1956-1985 and from 2002 to present). Its emblem is a white elephant, after the war elephants that served in the namesake's army during his rule as Sultan of Aceh.

Military Territorial units 
The region is composed of 2 Military Area Commands, 1 Training Regiment and 1 Independent Military District.
 0101st Military District Command/Self-supporting in Banda Aceh
 011st Military Area Command/Lilawangsa with HQ in Lhokseumawe
 0102nd Military District Command
 0103rd Military District Command
 0104th Military District Command
 0106th Military District Command
 0108th Military District Command
 0111st Military District Command
 0113rd Military District Command
 0117th Military District Command
 0119th Military District Command
 012nd Military Area Command/Teuku Umar with HQ in Meulaboh
 0105th Military District Command 
 0107th Military District Command
 0109th Military District Command
 0110th Military District Command
 0112nd Military District Command
 0114th Military District Command
 0115th Military District Command
 0116th Military District Command
 0118th Military District Command
 115th Raider Infantry Battalion
 116th Infantry Battalion
 117th Infantry Battalion

Support formations 
 RMC Iskandar Muda Military Police Command (Pomdam IM)
 RMC Iskandar Muda Public Affairs Bureau (Pendam IM)
 RMC Iskandar Muda Adjutant General's Office (Anjendam IM)
 RMC Iskandar Muda Military Physical Fitness and Sports Bureau (Jasdam IM)
 RMC Iskandar Muda Medical Department (Kesdam IM)
 RMC Iskandar Muda Veterans and National Reserves Administration (Babiminvetcadam IM)
 RMC Iskandar Muda Topography Service (Topdam IM)
 RMC Iskandar Muda Chaplaincy Corps (Bintaldam IM)
 RMC Iskandar Muda Finance Office (Kudam IM)
 RMC Iskandar Muda Legal Affairs Office (Kumdam IM)
 RMC Iskandar Muda HQ and HQ Services Detachment (Denmadam IM)
 RMC Iskandar Muda Information and Communications Technology Oiffice (Infolahtadam IM)
 RMC Iskandar Muda Logistics and Transportation Division (Bekangdam IM)
 RMC Iskandar Muda Signals Division (Hubdam IM)
 RMC Iskandar Muda Ordnance Corps (Paldam IM)
 RMC Iskandar Muda Engineering Division (Zidam IM)
 RMC Iskandar Muda Cyber Operations Unit (Sandidam IM)
 RMC Iskandar Muda Intelligence Command (Deninteldam IM)

Training Units
Training units in Kodam Iskandar Muda are organized under the Iskandar Muda Regional Training Regiment (Rindam Iskandar Muda). The units are as follows:

 Regiment HQ
 NCO School
 Basic Combat Training Center
 National Defense Training Command 
 Specialist Training School 
 Enlisted Personnel Training Unit

Combat and Combat Support units 
 25th Raider Infantry Brigade (Special Operations)/Siwah
 Brigade HQ
 111th Raider Battalion 
 113th Mechanized Raider Infantry Battalion 
 114th Raider Infantry Battalion 
 112th Raider Infantry Battalion/Dharma Jaya
 11th Armored Cavalry Battalion/Serbu Macan Setia Cakti
 11th Armored Cavalry Troop
 17th Field Artillery Battalion/Rencong Cakti
 16th Combat Engineers Battalion/Dhika Anoraga
 1st Air Defense Missile Artillery Divisional Detachment/Cigra Satria Bhuana Yudha

References

External links 
 command official webpage

Military of Indonesia
Military units and formations of Indonesia
02
Aceh
Sumatra
Military units and formations established in 1956
Military units and formations disestablished in 1985
Military units and formations established in 2002